The 1922 Tempe Normal Owls football team was an American football team that represented Tempe Normal School (later renamed Arizona State University) as an independent during the 1922 college football season. In their first and only season under head coach Ernest C. Wills, the Owls compiled a 0–3–1 record and were outscored by their opponents by a combined total of 74 to 31. Pete Brown was the team captain.

Schedule

References

Tempe Normal
Arizona State Sun Devils football seasons
College football winless seasons
Tempe Normal Owls football